Theresa Guichard Amayo Brasini (13 July 1933 – 24 January 2022) was a Brazilian actress.

Life and career
Amayo began her career on stage in the 1950s. She was an early star of Brazilian television, first working for Rede Tupi, and then being one of the first actresses who got an exclusive contract by Rede Globo. Her major works include  Sangue e Areia (1967–1968) and Pecado Capital (1975–1976). 

The wife of the actor, screenwriter and film director Mário Brasini, in 2004 Amayo lost her daughter, her son-in-law and her grandson in the Indian Ocean tsunami. In 2019 she was awarded best actress at the 52nd edition of the Festival de Brasília for her performance in the film Dulcina. 

Amayo died after a one-year battle with kidney cancer in Rio de Janeiro, on 24 January 2022, at the age of 88.

Select filmography

References

External links 
 
 Theresa Amayo at Enciclopédia Itaú Cultural

1933 births
2022 deaths
Brazilian film actresses
Brazilian stage actresses
Brazilian television actresses
Deaths from kidney cancer
People from Belém
Deaths from cancer in Brazil